Holding Together is an album by American jazz saxophonist Oliver Lake recorded in 1975 for the Italian Black Saint label.

Reception

The AllMusic review awarded the album 4 stars.

Track listing
All compositions by Oliver Lake except as indicated
 "Trailway Shake/Sad Lo-Uis" - 10:04 
 "Hasan" - 4:12 
 "USTA B" - 6:25 
 "Holding Together" - 10:30 
 "Machine Wing" - 7:39 
 "Ballad" (Michael Gregory Jackson) - 1:41 
Recorded at Generation Sound Studios in New York City in March, 1976

Personnel
Oliver Lake - alto saxophone, soprano saxophone, flute, percussion
Michael Gregory Jackson - guitar, mandolin, bamboo flute, percussion, vocals
Fred Hopkins - bass
Paul Maddox - drums, percussion

References

Black Saint/Soul Note albums
Oliver Lake albums
1976 albums